Kireyevsky District  is an administrative district (raion), one of the twenty-three in Tula Oblast, Russia. Within the framework of municipal divisions, it is incorporated as Kireyevsky Municipal District. It is located in the center of the oblast. Its administrative center is the town of Kireyevsk. Population: 75,142 (2010 Census);  The population of Kireyevsk accounts for 34.0% of the district's total population.

References

Notes

Sources

Districts of Tula Oblast